Randall Scott Hood (born August 9, 1968) is an American baseball coach and former player who is the current head baseball coach of the UNC Wilmington Seahawks. He played college baseball at Campbell for coach Mike Caldwell from 1987 to 1990 and played in Minor League Baseball (MiLB) for 5 seasons from 1990 to 1994.

Playing career
Hood attended Southern Wayne High School in Dudley, North Carolina. Hood played for the school's varsity baseball team. Hood then enrolled at Campbell University, to play college baseball for the Campbell Fighting Camels baseball team.

As a freshman at Campbell University in 1987, Hood had a .290 batting average, a .365 on-base percentage (OBP) and a .420 SLG.

In the 1989 season as a junior, Hood hit 4 home runs and 10 doubles. He was named to the All-Big South Conference team.

Hood had his best season as a senior in 1990, leading the team in hits (60), stolen bases (26), batting average (.366) and on-base percentage (.490).

Hood then signed as an undrafted free agent with the Milwaukee Brewers organization. He would then spend 3 seasons in the Chicago White Sox organization before going to spring training with the California Angels in 1995.

Coaching career
After failing to make the Angels in 1995, Hood joined the coaching staff at Campbell University. In the fall of 2001, Hood joined Mark Scalf's staff at UNC Wilmington.

On April 29, 2019, Hood was named the successor for the retiring Scalf.

Head coaching records
The following is a table of Hood's yearly records as an NCAA head coach.

References

External links

1968 births
Living people
Baseball outfielders
Arizona League Brewers players
Helena Brewers players
South Bend White Sox players
Stockton Ports players
Sarasota White Sox players
Erie Sailors players
Birmingham Barons players
Campbell Fighting Camels baseball coaches
Campbell Fighting Camels baseball players
UNC Wilmington Seahawks baseball coaches